MDNA is the twelfth studio album by American singer Madonna, released on March 23, 2012, by Interscope Records. The album was conceived while the singer was busy throughout 2011 with filming her directorial venture, W.E. Madonna started the recording in July 2011 and collaborated with a variety of producers such as Alle Benassi, Benny Benassi, Demolition Crew, Free School, Michael Malih, Indiigo, William Orbit, and Martin Solveig, the last two serving as primary producers of the record. The album features guest features by female rappers M.I.A. and Nicki Minaj.

The recording process was smooth although Madonna found difficulty working with Benny Benassi who did not speak fluent English and had to use his cousin Alle Benassi as interpreter. A pop and EDM record, MDNA consists of upbeat songs which lyrically explore themes of partying, love for music, infatuation, as well as heartbreak, revenge and separation. The album's title is a triple entendre and its allusion to MDMA drew negative reception from anti-drug groups.

MDNA was Madonna's first release under the 360 deal she had signed with Live Nation in 2007 and the three-album deal with Interscope in 2012. The record received promotion from Madonna's performance at Super Bowl XLVI halftime show as well as the MDNA Tour, the latter becoming one of the highest-grossing tours of all time. Four singles were released—"Give Me All Your Luvin'", "Girl Gone Wild", "Masterpiece" and "Turn Up the Radio". Its first single reached number ten on the Billboard Hot 100 extending Madonna's then record as the artist with the most top-ten singles in that chart's history.

Music critics were ambivalent towards the album. MDNA topped the record charts in most musical markets. Madonna set a new record for the most number-one albums by a solo artist in Australia and the United Kingdom. MDNA was the twelfth best-selling album of 2012 globally, and went on to sell two million copies.

Background and collaborations 

Following the end of her eleventh studio album, Hard Candy (2008) era, Madonna branched out into different ventures. She released her third greatest-hits album, Celebration (2009), introduced her Material Girl clothing line, opened Hard Candy Fitness centers across the world, and unveiled fashion brand Truth or Dare by Madonna which included perfumes, footwear, underclothing, and accessories. She also directed her second feature film, W.E., a biographical piece about the affair between King Edward VIII and Wallis Simpson.

As filming for W.E. was in progress, Madonna posted a message on her Facebook page exclaiming: "Its official! I need to move. I need to sweat. I need to make new music! Music I can dance to. I'm on the lookout for the maddest, sickest, most badass people to collaborate with. I'm just saying." She started working with producer William Orbit, with whom the singer had not collaborated since her eighth studio album, Music (2000). Noting that they shared great camaraderie, Madonna felt that Orbit would align with her musical choices.

In July 2011, French DJ Martin Solveig was invited for a writing session in London. Originally Madonna had enlisted Solveig for one song, but they ended up composing three in total—"Give Me All Your Luvin'", "I Don't Give A" and "Turn Up the Radio". In an interview with Billboard, Solveig felt that being Madonna's record producer would have been intimidating for him, so he avoided "thinking about the [singer], and do something that just makes sense". Several other producers joined the album, including Alessandro "Alle" Benassi and his brother Benny Benassi, The Demolition Crew, Michael Malih and Indiigo. Madonna enlisted female rappers Nicki Minaj and M.I.A., wanting to collaborate with "women who [...] have a strong sense of themselves". Australian singer Sia also submitted several proposals for the album, however, none of them made the final cut.

Recording sessions 
On July 4, 2011, Madonna's manager Guy Oseary announced that the singer had begun recording the album. Sessions took place at Sarm West Studios and Guerrilla Strip in London, Studio at the Palms in Las Vegas, MSR Studios in New York, 3:20 Studios in Los Angeles, and Free School in California.

In an interview with Channel V Australia, Solveig recalled that the recording sessions were smooth due to the camaraderie between Madonna and him. After the three songs were composed, the producer drafted another track called "Beautiful Killer", inspired by the French film, Le Samouraï (1967), a common interest with Madonna. For Madonna, Solveig's "methodical" thinking was important since she could refuse anything during the process without thinking about hurting his feelings. Solveig commented about Madonna's involvement in the production of the album:
She is as involved as you can be in the recording process. This was a very good and big surprise for me! I was assuming that she would spend only an hour or two in the studio per day and come and see where we were and say, "Ok I like this, I don't like that. I'll sing this. Bye!" And absolutely not... I mean we co-produced the track and it's not just written on the credits "co-produced by Martin Solveig and Madonna", we literally co-produced the tracks. I mean, at some point she wanted to choose the sound of a snare drum or a synth and that kind of stuff. She was really in the session!
While working with the Benassis, Madonna faced language problems since Benny was not fluent in English. She was shy but ultimately asked Alle Benassi to be an interpreter which was difficult for all three, but eventually they were able to overcome it. "With music it's so much about the vibe and the energy and you know when things are working and when they're not," clarified the singer.

Titling and artwork 

The album title was announced by Madonna as MDNA during an interview on The Graham Norton Show on January 11, 2012. When discussing the album on The Tonight Show with Jay Leno, Madonna explained that the title is a triple entendre, representing both her name and her DNA, as well as a reference to the drug MDMA, commonly known as ecstasy. During her gig at the Palau Sant Jordi as part of the MDNA Tour, Madonna told her audience: "Do you understand this concept? That we share DNA, regardless of beliefs or sexual orientation...? That we are all one?". Lucy Dawe, a spokesperson for the anti-drug campaign group Cannabis Skunk Sense, called the title "ill-advised".

The record's artwork was shot by Mert and Marcus and directed by Giovanni Bianco. The deluxe edition was unveiled through Madonna's official Facebook page on January 31, 2012. Jocelyn Vena of MTV News described the image as a "glamorous, deconstructed photograph" where Madonna "cocks her head up, her curly hair pulled back. She's wearing lots of mascara, bright red lipstick, a choker and a silky bright pink top. The photo has some kind of broken mirror filter over it, giving it a funky, dance-queen vibe." Robbie Daw of Idolator compared the artwork to the singer's third studio album cover, True Blue (1986), with similarity in Madonna's blond locks and the tilting of her head. The standard edition cover was revealed on February 6, 2012. Its art direction included the same color palette and the distorted appearance of the deluxe version image, but featured a body-shot of Madonna in a red dress and gloves with jewelry.

Music and lyrics 
MDNA is predominantly a pop and EDM album, which could be divided into two categories; "introspective" tracks created with Orbit, and "more ironic and funny and upbeat" tunes with Solveig. Christopher Rosa from Glamour noticed that although the album did not reference her ex-husband Guy Ritchie, he was a direct inspiration in the songwriting following their divorce in 2008. Thematically it explored the different facets of a post-divorce scenario, from somber mourning to releasing one's inhibitions after being suppressed in marriage, as well as anger and disdain. The album opens with the track "Girl Gone Wild", which contains influences of four on the floor and sounds similar to songs from Madonna's tenth studio album, Confessions on a Dance Floor (2005). Its introduction includes elements of "Act of Contrition" from her fourth studio album, Like a Prayer (1989), with the chorus speaks of "a girl gone wild" with "burning desire". The next song, "Gang Bang", is an EDM track with a dubstep breakdown and industrial beats. The lyrics describe a woman taking revenge on her lover, shooting him in his head.

In "I'm Addicted", Madonna talks about being infatuated with a person, like narcotic addiction, singing over a beat consisting of electro house and eurodance music. Fourth track "Turn Up the Radio" begins with a keyboard sequence before turning into a 1980s-inspired dance-pop number. Lyrically it urges the audience to relax while listening to music. "Give Me All Your Luvin'" had elements of bubblegum pop, synthpop, new wave and disco. The track features cheerleading chants between the verses while Minaj and M.I.A. raps during the intermediate section. The dance song "Some Girls" was inspired by hardstyle and Madonna lists different personality of girls. "Superstar" has backing vocals from her daughter Lourdes. A dance-pop song with a dubstep hook and influences of electronica, the lyrics find Madonna comparing her lover with famous men including John Travolta, Abraham Lincoln and Al Capone, while she claimed to be their "biggest fan".

"I Don't Give A" contains industrial beats and hip-hop influences, and lyrically speaks about Madonna's daily life while responding to her critics. Minaj's guest rapping verse praises the singer, "There is only one queen, and that's Madonna, bitch" as well as makes references to Madonna's "Material Girl", "We material girls, ain't nobody hotter, pops collar!" A 1960s inspired rock and roll and country music forms the backbone of "I'm a Sinner", with Madonna naming different saints and their virtues, and calling herself a transgressor. "Love Spent" has a contrasting composition from banjo and electronic music, creating a "refreshing, contemporary, radio friendly pop sound". The song discusses how money was a triggering factor in ending Madonna's marriage. The overall tempo on MDNA slows down with the next two songs. "Masterpiece", which was also included in the soundtrack of W.E., is a ballad with traces of Latin music. The song has instrumentation from strings, guitars and percussion, and speaks about the pain of being in love with someone perfect. The standard version of the album ended with "Falling Free", a ballad with a simple melody on a bassline, and complex lyrics that highlighted love, freedom and exaltation.

The deluxe version of MDNA has the song "I Fucked Up", a slow-paced tune whose lyrics finds Madonna admitting the reasons her marriage failed. The concept song "Beautiful Killer" has a string arrangement reminiscent of Madonna's 1986 single "Papa Don't Preach". The singer portrays the point of view of a victim and a murderer. "B-Day Song" is a "goof off" tune featuring M.I.A., with a punk style bassline and percussion. According to Jon Pareles, Madonna laments the loss of a lover in the last song "Best Friend", and admits to feeling guilty and remorseful in the "haunting slow jam".

Release and promotion 
In December 2011, Oseary and Live Nation Entertainment announced that they had developed a long-term plan for Madonna through which she was booked for a three-album contract with Interscope Records. It was the beginning of the 360 deal which the singer had signed with Live Nation in 2007, including "new studio albums, touring, merchandising, fan club/website, DVD's, music-related television and film projects and associated sponsorship agreements". MDNAs released date was confirmed as March 23, 2012 in Australia and Germany, and March 26 in rest of the other markets including United States. It was Madonna's third studio album to bear the Parental Advisory label after Erotica (1992) and American Life (2003), due to the profanity used in tracks such as "Gang Bang". In a 2011 year-end readers poll by Billboard, it was voted as the most anticipated album of 2012. An edited version of the standard edition of the album was made widely available, which completely omits the track "Gang Bang". An edited version of the deluxe edition was also released, which included an additional remix of "Give Me All Your Luvin'". The edited version of the deluxe edition was exclusively available at Wal-Mart stores in the US.

Super Bowl 

The promotional activities for MDNA began with Madonna performing at the Super Bowl XLVI halftime show on February 5, 2012, at Lucas Oil Stadium in Indianapolis, Indiana. The show was conceptualized by Cirque Du Soleil and Madonna's longtime collaborator Jamie King, along with visual media group Moment Factory enlisted. The performance featured 17 dancers, 20 dancing dolls, a 200-member church choir, and a drum line consisting of 100 percussionists. Total 36 image projectors were used for the lighting and visuals. The show began with Madonna being carried into the stadium by 150 bearers. She performed "Give Me All Your Luvin'" with Minaj and M.I.A. on the show, along with her past hits—"Vogue", "Music" and "Like a Prayer". Once the show concluded, a group of 250 volunteers dismantled the stage in six minutes.

Madonna was not paid for performing at the halftime show since it provided global exposure for an artist. The show was a success, setting a Super Bowl halftime-show record of 114 million viewers (higher than the viewership of the game itself). Keith Caulfield from Billboard reported a 17-fold sales increase for Madonna's back catalog and strong pre-order sales for MDNA (about 50,000 copies ordered at the iTunes Store). However the performance faced criticism when M.I.A. had extended her middle finger to the camera near the end of her verse during "Give Me All Your Luvin, in place of the word "shit". The rapper was penalized, and the NFL apologized for their inability to blur out the image during transmission.

Singles 

"Give Me All Your Luvin'" was released as the first single from the album on February 3, 2012. Sal Cinquemani from Slant Magazine complimented the "catchy" melodies, but declared the composition inferior to Madonna's previous singles. Other reviewers like Alexis Petridis from The Guardian and Joey Guerra from Houston Chronicle considered the track to be a weak lead single, and not a proper representation of the album. The song reached the top of the charts in Canada, Finland, Hungary and Venezuela. It became Madonna's 38th top-ten hit on the Billboard Hot 100, extending her record as the artist with most top-ten singles in the chart's history.

The album's second single, "Girl Gone Wild", was released for digital download on March 2, 2012. The black-and-white music video for the song was directed by fashion photographers Mert and Marcus. "Girl Gone Wild" debuted at number six on the Billboard Bubbling Under Hot 100 Singles chart with 22,000 downloads sold. It reached the top of the Dance Club Songs chart, giving Madonna a record 73rd week atop the ranking. 

"Masterpiece" was officially sent to radio stations in the United Kingdom on April 2, 2012. The song performed the best in Russia, where it topped the Russian Music Charts for the week of December 2, 2012.

"Turn Up the Radio" was released as the fourth and final single from the album, on June 29, 2012 in Italy. It became the third single from MDNA to top the US dance charts. 

In Brazil, "Superstar" was released on December 3, 2012, as a promotional single, in the form of a special edition CD with Brazilian newspaper Folha de S. Paulo. The accompanying cover art was created by Brazilian graffiti artist Simone Sapienza, who won a contest sponsored by Johnnie Walker's Keep Walking Project in Brazil; she was chosen by Madonna from ten finalists.

Media 
Following her performance at the Super Bowl, the album received limited promotion from Madonna, with Oseary citing the MDNA Tour rehearsals as the reason. Orbit expressed his displeasure about the promotion scarcity recalling that they had little time for recording MDNA since Madonna's schedule was full of other commitments, such as "perfume launch and teen fashion contests". He also blamed the "rush marketing" and the timing of the record's release as reasons for not promoting.

Madonna instead used social media to promote MDNA, by posting minute-long snippets of several album tracks, behind-the-scenes pictures of tour rehearsals, and online polls asking her fans regarding tour set list. On March 24 she participated in a livestream chat on Facebook, which was hosted by Jimmy Fallon. In order to boost the album streams Madonna partnered with Spotify, and launched an opportunity for its listeners to win two tickets for the MDNA Tour. For eligibility, users had to stream the album thrice on Spotify within two weeks of release. She later made a brief appearance on Ultra Music Festival in Miami a few days later, where she introduced Swedish DJ Avicii who played his remix of "Girl Gone Wild". At one point the singer asked the audience, "How many people in this crowd have seen Molly?" The statement was met with negative reception, with producer Deadmau5 condemning her use of the word molly, which is a slang for MDMA. Madonna responded on Twitter by posting a 1989 picture of herself, wearing Minnie Mouse ears, and a comment: "From one mouse to another. I don't support drug use and I never have. I was referring to the song called 'Have You Seen Molly' written by my friend Cedric Gervais who I almost worked with on [MDNA]."

Tour 

Following the Super Bowl performance, Madonna announced the MDNA Tour which started in May 2012 at Tel Aviv, Israel and ended in South America in December 2012. The tour played in different venues like stadiums and arenas, as well as outdoor locations like the Plains of Abraham in Quebec. After visiting 26 markets in Europe, the tour returned to North America, where it remained until Thanksgiving 2012, and then moved South America. Like her previous few tours, Madonna canceled plans of visiting Australia and apologized for it. The tour was described by the singer as "a journey of a soul from darkness to light". It was divided into four sections: Transgression, Prophecy, Masculine/Feminine and Redemption. The triangle-shaped stage consisted of two walkways for Madonna to wade into the crowd and an enclosed area where fans could get closer. Designers working on the tour's wardrobe included Jean Paul Gaultier, Arianne Phillips and Givenchy's Riccardo Tisci.

The tour portrayed controversial subjects such as violence, firearms, human rights, nudity, and politics. During one sequence the face of French far right politician Marine Le Pen appeared on the screen with a swastika on her forehead. Other segments showed the singer attacking dancers with fake guns, blood spattering on the backdrop screens, mooning, and briefly exposing her breasts to the audience. Despite the controversies, the MDNA Tour received positive reviews and became the highest-grossing tour of 2012 and was at that time the tenth highest-grossing tour of all time, grossing $305.1 million in ticket sales from 88 sold-out shows, watched by an audience of 2.21 million. The Miami shows on November 19–20, 2012 were recorded and released as a live album.

Critical reception 

Upon its release, reviews ranged from favorable to mixed. At Metacritic, which assigns a normalized rating out of 100 to reviews from mainstream critics, MDNA received an average score of 64, based on 34 reviews, which indicates "generally favorable reviews". Andy Gill from The Independent felt that the record represented a "determined, no-nonsense restatement" of Madonna's brand of music, after the underwhelming response she had received for Hard Candy. Rolling Stone writer Joe Levy rated the release 3.5 out of 5 stars, describing it as a "disco-fied divorce record". He described the music composition as suggestive, but found depth in the content after repeated listening. Priya Elan of NME called MDNA as "a ridiculously enjoyable romp" while finding that lyrically they were the most intimate songwriting that Madonna had ever done. Slant Magazines Sal Cinquemani found the album to be "surprisingly cohesive" in spite of the multiple producers, and commended Madonna and Orbit's compositions as among the best. Shirley Halperin from Billboard felt that Madonna was correct in not creating retro sounding music like her peers and believed that the singer's intuition in knowing what's popular in the musical landscape was beneficial for the album since EDM was becoming popular at that time. Also from Billboard, Joel Lynch opined that "while it didn't quite seem to resonate emotionally with fans upon its release, it certainly has its moments".

Nick Levine, from BBC News, pointed out that "there's no denying MDNA delivers thrills [...] but also has something the last two Madge albums lacked: ballads, both of which are quite lovely". He concluded his review by saying that "[MDNA] isn't just a good pop album, it's a good Madonna album too". Orbit's production received positive feedback from critics. Simon Goddard of Q listed MDNA as Madonna's best album since Ray of Light (1998), as did Chicago Tribune reviewer Greg Kot, who felt that the singer outdid on the Orbit-produced tracks. Caryn Ganz from Spin rated the album 7 out of 10 and said that "if there's one producer who knows how to pluck Madonna's heartstrings, it's Orbit". Writing for The New York Times, Jon Pareles summarized that it was Madonna's "pop instinct" and ability to craft hooks that helped the record become a success musically. In his consumer guide review, critic Robert Christgau gave the album an A− rating. He preferred an alternate track list of the record, highlighting the first 10 track as "updated 90s arena-dance power tracks". According to Jennifer Gannon, from Irish website State, "what MDNA offers is the ideal that pop doesn't always have to be the newest, craziest thing to be effective; it doesn't have to deny the past to be relevant".

Mixed reception came from AllMusic editor Stephen Thomas Erlewine, who described MDNA as "flinty" and "excessively lean" as a result of "cool calculations" in developing the music and catering to the contemporary music market. Melissa Maerz of Entertainment Weekly found "all those reminders of her work ethic [in the song 'I Don't Give A' as] exhausting". Emily Mackay of The Quietus noted a "lack of ambition" and accused Madonna of "playing it safe" on MDNA. The Observers Gareth Grundy was ambivalent toward the record's "clumsy rave-pop" tracks, feeling that "the more relaxed, less stentorian tracks sparkle". He opined that the second half of the release "sounds as if it's been borrowed from an entirely different and much better project". Alexis Petridis of The Guardian viewed the album as "neither triumph nor disaster", writing that it "turns out to be just another Madonna album". Similarly, Instincts Samuel Murrian concluded that "there is no such thing as a bad Madonna album; MDNA, though, is the closest thing there is to a lifeless one". Graham Gremore from Queerty felt that "had it been released by another pop artist — perhaps someone younger and less established — it may have fared better. But coming from an icon like Madonna, it was, put simply, a disappointment".

Helen Brown of The Daily Telegraph criticized the songwriting for being "horribly clichéd", as well as Madonna's constant need to look and sound "like a teenager" in the tracks. Pitchforks Matthew Perpetua found most of the record as "shockingly banal" and "particularly hollow, the dead-eyed result of obligations, deadlines, and hedged bets". Maura Johnston of The Village Voice criticized Madonna's vocals and her incorporation of EDM as insincere. Los Angeles Times writer Randall Roberts felt that the composition suffers from "familiarity" and MDNA was evidence that Madonna's music had become regressive. Genevieve Koski of The A.V. Club criticized its "electronically manipulated" vocals and "big, generic Euro-dance beats", calling MDNA "competent, but equally perfunctory". Wiriting for Turkish newspaper Radikal, Yazi Boyutu called it a "parody of the real Madonna [...] an unnecessary and ridiculous dance album". The Advocate gave a scathing review: "Lacking a central image or theme, MDNA instead relied on uninspiring beats and silly references to guns and partying. Singles like 'Give Me All Your Luvin' and 'Girl Gone Wild' were so vapid, they made Taylor Swift songs look like cuts from a Joni Mitchell album. Almost instantly forgettable". The Sydney Morning Heralds Bernard Zuel panned the album as "cold, stale and depressingly ordinary".

 Commercial performance 

MDNA received the largest number of pre-order of the album at the iTunes Store since it was announced in February 2012. According to the International Federation of the Phonographic Industry (IFPI), MDNA was the twelfth best-selling album of 2012 globally with sales of 1.8 million copies. As of March 2014 it has sold over two million copies worldwide.

In the United States, the album debuted at number one on the Billboard 200 with 359,000 copies sold, making it Madonna's biggest first-week sales since Music (2000). It became Madonna's eighth chart-topper and her fifth consecutive studio album to debut at number one. The album's sales were aided by her tour audience, who had an option to receive the release as part of their ticket purchase. Around 185,000 copies of the first-week sales reportedly came from the album-ticket bundling. The next week, the album descended to number eight with sales of 48,000 copies or 86.7% decline, making it the then-largest second-week percentage sales drop for a number-one debuting album of the Nielsen SoundScan era. The album was present on the Billboard 200 for a total of 13 weeks and was certified gold by the Recording Industry Association of America (RIAA), for shipment of 500,000 copies. As of February 2015, it had sold 539,000 copies in the United States. In Canada, MDNA debuted at number one on the Canadian Albums Chart, selling 32,000 copies in its first week. The album also debuted at number one in Brazil and was certified double platinum by the Associação Brasileira dos Produtores de Discos (ABPD) for sales of 80,000 copies.

In Australia, the album debuted at number one and was certified gold by the Australian Recording Industry Association (ARIA) for shipments of 35,000 copies during its first week. It became Madonna's tenth chart-topping album in Australia, which made her the solo artist with the most number-one albums of all time, thus surpassing Jimmy Barnes, and placed behind only the Beatles with 14 and U2 with 11. In Japan, MDNA debuted at number four on the Oricon Albums Chart with first-week sales of 31,000 physical units. In the same week, her Warner Bros.-released box set, The Complete Studio Albums (1983–2008), also debuted at number nine, making Madonna the first international female artist in Japanese chart history to have two albums in the top ten. With those two releases, Madonna accumulated 22 top-ten albums in Japan, more than any other international artist. MDNA was certified gold by the Recording Industry Association of Japan (RIAJ) for shipments of 100,000 units. Madonna also set a record for a foreign album in Turkey as MDNA sold over 30,000 copies within four days, outselling all Turkish domestic albums.

In the United Kingdom, the album debuted at the top of the UK Albums Chart with first-week sales of 56,335 copies. It became Madonna's 12th album to top the chart, breaking the record previously held by Elvis Presley, as the solo artist with the most number-one albums ever. Up to that point, only the Beatles had more number-one albums in British chart history, with 15. Presley reclaimed that record with his posthumous compilation album, The Wonder of You (2016). MDNA stayed in the top ten for two weeks before descending the chart. As of March 2015, the album had sold 134,803 copies in the country, being certified gold by the British Phonographic Industry (BPI). In Russia, the album debuted atop the chart with 26,000 sold. After two weeks, the album accumulated sales of over 50,000 units there and 1.5 million streams, and was later certified seven-times platinum equivalent for sales of 70,000 copies. Across Europe, the album reached the top of the charts in Belgium, Croatia, Czech Republic, Finland, Hungary, Ireland, Italy, Poland, Spain and Sweden, and the top ten in other nations.

 Recognition 

At the 69th Golden Globe Awards, "Masterpiece", which was included in the soundtrack for W.E., won the Golden Globe Award for Best Original Song. The track was also sent to be shortlisted at the 84th Academy Awards, in the category of Best Original Song, but was not considered since a song is eligible only if it appears in a film no later than the start of the final credits and "Masterpiece" is played after more than one minute into the credits. MDNA won the category of Top Dance Album at the 2013 Billboard Music Awards, where Madonna was also honored with the Top Touring Artist and Top Dance Artist trophies. At the 2014 World Music Awards, the album was nominated for Best World Album, but did not win the award.

With MDNA reaching number one on the UK Albums Chart, Madonna was listed in the Guinness World Records book for this achievement. Spin magazine listed MDNA as one of their 20 Best Pop Albums of 2012, where writer Carolina Guerra wrote: "If you can't hear Madge winking her way through EDM stunners 'Girl Gone Wild' and 'Some Girls', or retro bouncers 'Give Me All Your Luvin' and 'I'm a Sinner' you're letting your assumptions about the Queen's reign speak louder than her still-solid studio work." A later review in 2018 by Christopher Rosa from Glamour called MDNA as the "Ultimate Divorce Album", explaining that within the album there lies "catharsis", and how Madonna's divorce had led to "an amalgamation of feeling: elation, betrayal, depression, numbness, fury—the list goes on and on. Madonna hits all of those points on MDNA and then some. Truthfully, you'll finish the album with emotional whiplash, but isn't that divorce? Isn't that life?"

 Track listing Notes'
  signifies a co-producer
  signifies an additional producer
  signifies a remixer and additional producer

Personnel 
Credits adapted from the album's liner notes.

Production 

Madonna – songwriter, producer, executive producer, vocals, acoustic guitar
William Orbit – songwriter, producer, instrumentation, orchestra arrangement, orchestration
Martin Solveig – songwriter, producer, synths, drums, instruments, additional synths, additional drums
Klas Åhlund – songwriter, co-producer, instrumentation, original vocoder
Maya Arulpragasam – songwriter, vocals
Jean-Baptiste – songwriter, additional vocals
Elena Barere – concertmaster
Alle Benassi – songwriter, producer, co-producer
Benny Benassi – songwriter, producer, co-producer
Lise Berthaud – viola
Jade Williams – songwriter
Don Juan Demo Casanova – songwriter
Julie Frost – songwriter
Priscilla Hamilton – songwriter
Keith Harris – songwriter
Jimmy Harry – songwriter, additional producer
Joe Henry – songwriter
Nicki Minaj – songwriter, vocals
Indiigo – songwriter, producer
Ryan Buendia – songwriter, instrumentation
Julien Jabre – songwriter, electric guitars, drums, synths
Stephen Kozmeniuk – songwriter
Michael Malih – songwriter, producer
Michael McHenry – songwriter
Mika – songwriter
Laurie Mayer – songwriter
Andros Rodriguez – engineer
Michael Tordjman – songwriter, synths, guitars
Jenson Vaughan – songwriter
Alain Whyte – songwriter, instrumentation
The Demolition Crew – producer, co-producer

Musicians 

Graham Archer – recording
Quentin Belarbi – assistant engineer
Hahn-Bin – violin
Diane Barere – celli
David Braccini – violin
Christophe Briquet – viola, musicians contractor
Karen Brunon – violin
Bob Carlisle – French horn
Jeff Carney – bass
Demo Castellon – mixing, recording, drums, bass, engineering
Cecile Coutelier – live strings recording assistant
David Eggert – dancing
Stephanie Cummins – celli
Barbara Currie – French horn
Jason Metal Donkersgoed – additional editing, additional recording
Desiree Elsevier – violin
Romain Faure – additional synths
Frank Filipetti – engineering
Akemi Fillon – violin
Pierre Fouchenneret – violin
Free School – co-producer
Jean-Baptiste Gaudray – guitar
Chris Gehringer – mastering
Anne Gravoin – violin
Mary Hammann – violin
Gloria Kaba – assistant engineer
Ian Kagey – assistant engineer
Rob Katz – assistant engineer
Abel Korzeniowski – conductor
The Koz – editing, vocoder, keyboard, synths, additional programing, additional editing
Paul Kremen – marketing
Raphael Lee – assistant engineer
Brad Leigh – assistant engineer
Lola Leon – background vocals
Diane Lesser – English horn
Vincent Lionti – violins
LMFAO – remix, additional producer
Brett Mayer – assistant engineer
Nelson Milburn – assistant engineer
Christophe Morin – cello
Sarah Nemtanu – violin
Jessica Phillips – clarinet
Stephane Reichart – live strings recording
Miwa Rosso – cello
Dov Scheindlin – violins
Stacey Shames – harp
Fred Sladkey – assistant engineer
Sébastien Surel – violin
Ayako Tanaka – violin
Ron Taylor – Pro Tools editing, additional vocal editing
Natasha Tchitch – viola
Angie Teo – recording, mix assistant, additional editing, engineering, assistant engineers
Alan Tilston – assistant, drums, percussion, instrumentation
Michael Turco – additional synths, outro music
Sarah Veihan – cello
David Wakefield – French horn
Dan Warner – guitars
Philippe Weiss – recording
Ellen Westermann – celli
Peter Wolford – assistant engineer
Kenta Yonesaka – engineer

Business 

Jill Dell Abate – contractor, production coordinator
Cathialine Zorzi – musicians contractor assistant
Sara Zambreno – management
Liz Rosenberg – publicity
Guy Oseary – management
Richard Feldstein – business management
Shari Goldschmidt – business management
Marlies Dwyer – legal
Michael Goldsmith – legal
P.C. – legal
Joseph Penachio – legal
Shire & Meiselas – legal
Mark Baechle – copyist
Grubman – legal
Indursky – legal

Packaging 

Giovanni Bianco – art direction
Mert and Marcus – photography
Arianne Phillips – styling
Gina Brooke – makeup
Garren – hair
Antonio Bernardi – wardrobe
YSL – wardrobe
Alexandre Vauthier – wardrobe
Tom Ford – wardrobe
Prada – wardrobe
Markus Lupfer – wardrobe
Miu Miu – wardrobe
Gucci – wardrobe
Kiki de Montparnasse – wardrobe
Dolce & Gabbana – wardrobe
Delfina Delettrez – wardrobe
Dorothy Gaspar – wardrobe

Charts

Weekly charts

Monthly charts

Year-end charts

Certifications and sales

Release history

See also 

 List of Billboard 200 number-one albums of 2012
 List of Billboard number-one electronic albums of 2012
 List of number-one albums of 2012 (Australia)
 List of number-one albums of 2012 (Canada)
 List of number-one albums of 2012 (Finland)
 List of number-one albums of 2012 (Ireland)
 List of number-one albums of 2012 (Mexico)
 List of number-one albums of 2012 (Poland)
 List of number-one albums of 2012 (Spain)
 List of number-one hits of 2012 (Italy)
 List of number-one singles and albums in Sweden
 List of UK Albums Chart number ones of the 2010s

Notes

References

External links 
 
 

2012 albums
Albums produced by Free School
Albums produced by Madonna
Albums produced by William Orbit
Interscope Records albums
Madonna albums
Albums involved in plagiarism controversies